Manchester Metropolitan University Business School (MMUBS) is a triple-accredited business school of Manchester Metropolitan University. It traces its roots as a provider of business education back to 1889, and has a rich history of supporting industry and commerce in the city of Manchester. 

Over 9,000 students are enrolled across the Business School’s undergraduate, postgraduate and research degrees. A further 2,000 students are enrolled in degree apprenticeship programmes.  

In 2019, Manchester Metropolitan University Business School was awarded EQUIS accreditation, a renowned international benchmark of excellence for business schools.  

Manchester Metropolitan University was named the leading university provider for degree apprenticeships in the 2021 RateMyApprenticeship Awards, and ranks in the top ten UK universities for knowledge transfer partnerships.

Professional accreditations

 Association to Advance Collegiate Schools of Business (AACSB)
 Association for Business Psychology (ABP)
 Association of British Professional Conference Organisers (ABPCO)
 Association of Chartered Certified Accountants (ACCA)
 Association for Project Management (APM)
 Association of MBAs (AMBA)
 British Computer Society, The Chartered Institute for IT 3 (BCS-3)
 Chartered Institute of Logistics and Transport (CILT)
 Chartered Institute of Management Accountants (CIMA)
 Chartered Institute of Marketing  (CIM)
 Chartered Institute of Personal Development (CIPD)
 Chartered Institute of Public Finance and Accountancy (CIPFA)
 Chartered Institute of Procurement and Supply (CIPS)
 Chartered Institute of Public Relations (CIPR)
 Chartered Management Institute (CMI)
 EFMD Quality Improvement System (EQUIS)
 Institute of Chartered Accountants of England and Wales (ICAEW)
 Institute of Data and Marketing (IDM)
 Institute of Enterprise and Entrepreneurs (IOEE)
 Institute of Place Management (IPM)
 Small Business Charter (SBC)

Academic divisions

Accounting, Finance and Banking
Marketing, Retail and Tourism
Strategy, Enterprise and Sustainability
People and Performance
Operations, Technology, Events and Hospitality Management
Economics, Policy and International Business

Research

Research at the Manchester Metropolitan University Business School is conducted across three University Centres for Research and Knowledge Exchange (UCRKEs):

Business Transformations – aims to identify and inform regional, national and international industrial, digital and place-making strategies that will enable transformative change needed for businesses to thrive. In 2006, researchers from the centre established the Institute of Place Management (IPM), the international professional body that supports people committed to developing, managing and making places better. Representatives from the centre also lead the UK Government’s High Streets Task Force.
Decent Work and Productivity – brings together specialists in leadership, human resource, entrepreneurship and organisational behaviour, to help improve workplaces of all sizes
Future Economies - helps businesses, policymakers and civic society identify and respond to the most pressing future challenges including Brexit, national and regional industrial strategies, green economies and mega-sporting events

Alumni

 Paul S. Walsh, CEO of Diageo
 Dianne Thompson, CEO of Camelot Group
 Jonathan Mildenhall, Marketing director of Coca-Cola
 Michael Turner, former CEO of BAE Systems
 Gordon Taylor, CEO of Professional Footballers Association

Other usage
The Manchester Metropolitan University Business School Business School premises are also used for conferences and events such as SAScon and the Chartered Institute of Personnel and Development Manchester conference.

References

External links
 Manchester Metropolitan University Business School website
 Manchester Law School
 Manchester Metropolitan University website

 

Business School
Business schools in England